Lucas González may refer to:
 Lucas González, Argentina, a village and municipality in Entre Ríos Province in north-eastern Argentina
 Lucas González (football manager) (born 1981), Colombian football manager
 Lucas González (footballer, born 1997), Argentine forward
 Lucas González (footballer, born 2000), Argentine midfielder
 Lucas González Amorosino, Argentine rugby union player